Atlético de Madrid returned to La Liga following a two-year absence, having a safe ride in the midfield under Luis Aragonés. The season marked the breakthrough of Fernando Torres, the striker making his La Liga debut by the start of the season, scoring 13 league goals as a teenager. Demetrio Albertini was a key signing before the season, the experienced Italian providing a solid display before departing for Lazio in his home country.

Squad

Goalkeepers
  Germán Burgos
  Esteban
  Juanma

Defenders
  Jorge Otero
  Mirsad Hibić
  García Calvo
  Santi
  Sergi
  Carreras
  Armando
  Fabricio Coloccini
  Cosmin Contra

Midfielders
  Txomin Nagore
  José Movilla
  Demetrio Albertini
  Jovan Stanković
  Carlos Aguilera
  Emerson
  Luis García
  Jorge Larena

Attackers
  Fernando Torres
  Dani
  Javi Moreno
  Fernando Correa
  José Mari

Transfers

In
  José Mari from A.C. Milan loan
  Javi Moreno from A.C. Milan loan
  Demetrio Albertini from A.C. Milan loan
  Fabricio Coloccini from A.C. Milan loan
  Cosmin Contra from A.C. Milan loan

Competitions

La Liga

League table

Matches

Top goalscorers
  Fernando Torres 13
  Luis García 7
  José Mari 5
  Javi Moreno 5
  Fernando Correa 4

Atlético Madrid seasons
Atletico Madrid